Eric Staves (born November 30, 1990) is an American actor. He is best known for his character on the film Goat where played the character Ben Baity.

Personal life

Staves was born November 30, 1990 in Liberty, Missouri.  He graduated from Liberty High School, where he was a three-year letterman for the football team, He was also on the forensics and debate team where he was a Missouri state champion.  In 2008, Staves earned the coveted Eagle Scout award from the Boy Scouts of America.

Filmography

References

External links
 

Living people
1990 births
American male television actors
American male film actors
DePaul University alumni
People from Liberty, Missouri